At the 1924 Summer Olympics in Paris, eleven swimming events were contested, six for men and five for women. The competitions were held from Sunday July 13, 1924, to Sunday July 20, 1924.

There were 169 participants from 23 countries competing.  The United States team, coached by Bill Bachrach, won 19 of the 33 medals, and 9 of the 11 gold medals.

Medal table

Medal summary

Men's events

Women's events

Participating nations
A total of 169 swimmers (118 men and 51 women) from 23 nations (men from 22 nations - women from 10 nations) competed at the Paris Games:

  (men:4 women:0)
  (men:5 women:0)
  (men:6 women:0)
  (men:2 women:0)
  (men:6 women:3)
  (men:0 women:4)
  (men:2 women:0)
  (men:12 women:8)
  (men:15 women:11)
  (men:1 women:0)
  (men:5 women:1)
  (men:6 women:0)
  (men:6 women:0)
  (men:2 women:2)
  (men:8 women:4)
  (men:1 women:1)
  (men:1 women:0)
  (men:1 women:0)
  (men:4 women:0)
  (men:9 women:5)
  (men:2 women:0)
  (men:14 women:12)
  (men:6 women:0)

References
 

 
1924 Summer Olympics events
1924
1924 in swimming